Nayland-with-Wissington is a civil parish which comprises the larger village of Nayland and the adjoining rural village of Wissington (these days usually referred to as 'Wiston' by local residents (Knox, 2001) ). They were originally two separate parishes and were united into one civil parish in 1884. However, the ecclesiastical parishes remain separate.

Nayland and Wiston lie on the northern bank of the River Stour which divides Essex and Suffolk in England.

Governance
The parish forms part of the electoral ward called Nayland. The population of this ward taken at the 2011 Census was 1,845.

References

Knox, Rosemary (2001). Is it Wiston or Wissington: An ancient rural Suffolk parish, R. Knox, Suffolk.

External links
Community website

Civil parishes in Suffolk
Babergh District